Richard Siken (born February 15, 1967) is an American poet, painter, and filmmaker. He is the author of the collection Crush (Yale University Press, 2005), which won the Yale Series of Younger Poets Competition in 2004. His second book of poems, War of the Foxes, was published by Copper Canyon Press in 2015.

Early life and education 
Siken was born in New York City. He studied at and received a B.A. in psychology and later a Master of Fine Arts in poetry from the University of Arizona.

Career 
In 2001, Siken co-founded Spork Press, where he continues to work as an editor.

Siken received a Literature Fellowship in Poetry from the National Endowment for the Arts, and his book Crush was awarded the Lambda Literary Award for "Gay Men's Poetry" in 2005, and the Thom Gunn Award from Publishing Triangle. The 1991 death of his boyfriend influenced his writing of the book.

Siken's book War of the Foxes became a recipient of two residencies with the Lannan Residency Program, and a Lannan Literary Selection.

Siken currently lives in Tucson, Arizona. On March 19, 2019, Siken reported on his Facebook that he had recently suffered a stroke. On December 4, 2020, he published his first post-stroke poem, "Real Estate" on poets.org after announcing it on his Facebook the day prior.

Awards
Crush won the 2004 Yale Series of Younger Poets prize, selected by Louise Glück. It was also a finalist for the National Book Critics Circle Award, the Lambda Literary Award, and the Thom Gunn Award.

Siken is also the recipient of a Pushcart Prize, two Arizona Commission on the Arts grants, and a fellowship from the National Endowment for the Arts.
 Yale Series of Younger Poets Competition, 2004, for Crush
 National Book Critics Circle Award, 2005, finalist 
 Lambda Literary Award, 2006 
 Thom Gunn Award, 2006 
 Lannan Residency Program, Fall 2007
 Lannan Residency Program, Spring 2014
 Pushcart Prize
 Two Arizona Commission on the Arts grants
 National Endowment for the Arts fellowship

Bibliography 

 Crush (Yale University Press, 2005) , 
 War of the Foxes (Copper Canyon Press, 2015) ,

References

External links 
 Official Website
 Profile of Richard Siken from Poetry magazine

American male poets
American gay writers
Lambda Literary Award for Gay Poetry winners
American LGBT poets
Jewish American writers
Living people
Writers from Tucson, Arizona
Yale Younger Poets winners
Poets from Arizona
1967 births
21st-century American poets
21st-century American male writers
21st-century American Jews
Gay poets